James Gordon MacArthur (December 8, 1937 – October 28, 2010) was an American actor with a long career in both movies and television. MacArthur's early work was predominantly in supporting roles in films. Later, he had a starring role as Danny "Danno" Williams, the reliable second-in-command of the fictional Hawaii State Police in the long-running television series Hawaii Five-O.

Early life

Born in Los Angeles, MacArthur was the adopted son of playwright Charles MacArthur and his wife, actress Helen Hayes. He grew up in Nyack, New York, along with his elder sister, the MacArthurs' biological daughter Mary, who died of polio in 1949. He was educated at Allen-Stevenson School in New York, and later at the Solebury School in New Hope, Pennsylvania, where he starred in basketball, football, and baseball.

In his final year at Solebury, MacArthur played guard on the football team; captained the basketball team; was president of his class, the student government, and the drama club; rewrote the school's constitution; edited the school paper, The Scribe; and played Scrooge in a local presentation of A Christmas Carol. He also started dating a fellow student, future actress Joyce Bulifant; they were married in November 1958 and divorced nine years later.

MacArthur grew up among people of literary and theatrical talent. Lillian Gish was his godmother, and his family's guests included John Steinbeck, John Barrymore, Harpo Marx, Ben Hecht, Beatrice Lillie, and the humorist Robert Benchley (whose grandson, Jaws-author Peter Benchley, was three years behind James at Allen-Stevenson).

Acting career

Early career 
His first radio role was on the Theatre Guild on the Air, in 1948. It was the premier radio program of its day, producing one-hour plays that were performed in front of a live audience of 800. Hayes accepted a role in one of the plays, which also had a small role for a child. Her son was asked if he would like to do it and he agreed.

MacArthur made his stage debut at Olney, Maryland in 1949 with a two-week stint in The Corn Is Green. His sister Mary was in the play and telephoned their mother to request that James go to Olney to be in it too. The following summer, he repeated the role at Dennis, Massachusetts, and his theatrical career was underway.

In 1954, he played John Day in Life with Father with Howard Lindsay and Dorothy Stickney. He became involved in important Broadway productions only after receiving his training in summer stock theatre.
He worked as a set painter, lighting director, and chief of the parking lot. During a Helen Hayes festival at the Falmouth Playhouse on Cape Cod, he had a few walk-on parts. He also helped the theatre electrician and grew so interested that he was allowed to stay on after his mother's plays had ended. As a result, he lit the show for Barbara Bel Geddes in The Little Hut and for Gloria Vanderbilt in The Swan.

Television 
In 1955, at the age of 18, he played Hal Ditmar in the television play, '"Deal a Blow," an episode of the series Climax! directed by John Frankenheimer and starring Macdonald Carey, Phyllis Thaxter, and Edward Arnold. The critical response was excellent, with the New York Times saying he "performed splendidly."

The following year Frankenheimer directed the movie version of the play, which was renamed The Young Stranger (1957), with MacArthur again in the starring role. Again, his performance was critically acclaimed, earning him a nomination for Most Promising Newcomer at the 1958 BAFTA awards.

In late 1956 it was announced MacArthur would make Underdog, based on a novel by W. R. Burnett, alongside his mother and Susan Strasberg but the project never materialized.

MacArthur returned to TV to appear in World in White (1957) and episodes of General Electric Theater, Studio One in Hollywood, and Westinghouse Desilu Playhouse.

Disney
MacArthur was selected by Walt Disney to star in The Light in the Forest (1958), playing a white man raised by Native Americans. In April 1957, he signed a three-picture deal with Disney. On Light in the Forest he was paid $2,500 a week. This went up to $3,000 a week for the second film and $3,500 for the third, although he could not be forced to work other than during his summer vacation at Harvard, where he was studying history.

Disney executives liked his performance and cast him in Third Man on the Mountain (1959), playing a young man who climbs the Matterhorn. His mother had a cameo.

Deciding to make acting his full-time career, he left Harvard in his second year to make two more Disney movies, Kidnapped (1960) alongside Peter Finch, and Swiss Family Robinson (1960) with John Mills. The latter was especially popular. He was named a possibility for Bon Voyage but ended up not appearing in the final film.

MacArthur made his Broadway debut in 1960, playing opposite Jane Fonda in Invitation to a March, for which he received a Theatre World Award. Although he never returned to Broadway, he would remain active in theatre throughout his career, appearing in such productions as Under the Yum Yum Tree, The Moon Is Blue, John Loves Mary (with his then-wife Joyce Bulifant), Barefoot in the Park, and Murder at the Howard Johnson's. He also released several records in the early 1960s, scoring two minor hits with "(The Story of) The In-Between Years" and "The Ten Commandments of Love," both of which peaked at number 94 in the Billboard Hot 100.

MacArthur gave a particularly chilling performance as baby-faced opium dealer Johnny Lubin in The Untouchables episode, "Death For Sale." He was in Bus Stop and Wagon Train. He returned to features as one of several young actors in The Interns (1962), Columbia's popular medical drama.

He did episodes of The Dick Powell Theatre, Sam Benedict, and Arrest and Trial, then made Spencer's Mountain (1963) at Warner Bros. with Henry Fonda and Cry of Battle (1963) in Philippines.

In 1963, he was nominated for the "Top New Male Personality" category of the Golden Laurel Awards 1963. That year he starred in and produced a pilot for a series about a writer, Postmark: Jim Fletcher, but it was not picked up.

He guest starred in Burke's Law, The Eleventh Hour, and The Great Adventure. After an episode of The Alfred Hitchcock Hour he did The Truth About Spring and The Bedford Incident, both in 1965. His role in The Bedford Incident was of a young ensign who became so rattled by the needling of his captain (Richard Widmark), that he accidentally fired an ASROC at a Soviet submarine, thus creating a nuclear incident when the submarine returned fire, resulting in the destruction of both vessels.

In Battle of the Bulge (1965), he again played the role of a young and inexperienced officer. MacArthur was in Ride Beyond Vengeance (1966) and guest starred in Branded, Combat!, Gunsmoke, Hondo, Insight, Death Valley Days, Bonanza, and The Virginian. In 1966, he guest-starred as Lt. Harley Wilson in "The Outsider," episode 20 in the second season of Twelve O'Clock High. He co-starred with his mother in the 1968 episode "The Pride of the Lioness" on the Tarzan television series.

MacArthur returned to Disney to make Willie and the Yank (1967) for television, released theatrically as Mosby's Marauders. He had a role in The Love-Ins (1967) for Sam Katzman.

His had a brief but memorable appearance in the Clint Eastwood movie Hang 'Em High as a preacher.

Hawaii Five-O
Hang 'Em High was written by Leonard Freeman, who was producing a new police procedural, Hawaii Five-0.  Tim O'Kelly was originally cast as Jack Lord's assistant but test audiences thought he was too young, so MacArthur was given the role. MacArthur said the producer "told us, 'We can be a big hit. This is a morality play. It's good versus evil and the good guys are going to win.' That was during the Vietnam era, and I think many people were looking for something like that."

MacArthur said Lord "said 'book him' to others in the cast, but I guess he said it to me the most. It wasn't anything we really thought about at first. But the phrase just took off and caught the public's imagination."

Appearing in the show made MacArthur very wealthy. He invested much of his earnings in Hawaiian real estate.

Bored with Hawaii Five-O, MacArthur left the show in 1979, one year before it ended. "It was just time," he said. "I called the producer from South America and told him I was heading down the Amazon River...."

"I grew bored," he explained. "The stories became more bland and predictable, and presented less and less challenge to me as an actor."

William Smith, who replaced him on the show, claimed MacArthur quit "because Jack Lord wouldn't let him have a dressing room. He had to change in the prop truck for eleven years."

After Hawaii Five-O
After leaving Hawaii Five-O, McArthur guest-starred on such television shows as Time Express, Murder, She Wrote, The Love Boat, Fantasy Island, Walking Tall, The Littlest Hobo, Vega$, and Superboy, as well as in the miniseries Alcatraz: The Whole Shocking Story (1980) and The Night the Bridge Fell Down (1983). He appeared in A Bedfull of Foreigners in Chicago in 1984 and in Michigan in 1985. He followed this with The Hasty Heart before taking a year out of show business.

In 1987, he returned to the stage in The Foreigner, then played Mortimer in the national tour of Arsenic and Old Lace with Jean Stapleton, Marion Ross, and Larry Storch. In 1989, he followed another stint in The Foreigner with Love Letters and in 1990–1991, A Bedfull of Foreigners in Las Vegas.

Semi-retirement
Throughout his career, MacArthur had also found time for various other ventures. From 1959 to 1960, he partnered with actors James Franciscus and Alan Ladd, Jr. in a Beverly Hills telephone answering service. In June 1972, he directed the Honolulu Community Theatre in a production of his father's play The Front Page.

For a period in the 1990s, he was part owner of Senior World publication, where he would write the occasional celebrity interview. He continued to appear at conventions, collectors' shows, and celebrity sporting events. A keen golfer, he was winner of the 2002 Frank Sinatra Invitational Charity Golf Tournament.

He also appeared in television and radio specials and interview programs. His latest appearances included spots on Entertainment Tonight, Christopher's Closeup, and the BBC Radio 5 Live obituary program Brief Lives, in which he paid tribute to his Hawaii Five-O castmate, the late Kam Fong. In 1997, MacArthur returned without Jack Lord (who was in declining health) to reprise his character, who had become Hawaii's governor, in the 1997 unaired pilot of Hawaii Five-O which starred actor Gary Busey.

In April 2003, he traveled to Honolulu's historic Hawaii Theatre for a cameo role in Joe Moore's play Dirty Laundry. Negotiations were underway in summer 2010 for MacArthur to make a cameo appearance in the new CBS primetime remake of Hawaii Five-O at the time of his death, a role that eventually was given to Al Harrington . On the November 1, 2010, episode, MacArthur's death was mentioned in a short tribute that played before the start of that episode.

In 2001, a Golden Palm Star on the Palm Springs Walk of Stars was dedicated to him.

Personal life and death
MacArthur's first wife was Joyce Bulifant. On the set of The Angry Breed (1968), MacArthur met actress Melody Patterson, who became his second wife. They wed on Kauai in July 1970 and divorced five years later. His third wife was former LPGA golfer Helen Beth Duntz. MacArthur had two daughters and two sons.

MacArthur died on October 28, 2010, at the age of 72 of unspecified causes, in Florida.

Filmography

References

External links

 
 
 
 
 James MacArthur  at Find a Grave

1937 births
2010 deaths
Deaths from cancer in Florida
20th-century American male actors
American adoptees
American male film actors
American male stage actors
Harvard University alumni
Male actors from Los Angeles